Abyssus Abyssum Invocat is the second compilation album by Polish extreme metal band Behemoth. It includes two EPs (Conjuration and Slaves Shall Serve) and five previously unreleased live recordings.

Track listing
All music composed by Nergal and all lyrics written by 
Krzysztof Azarewicz, except where noted.

Release history

References

Behemoth (band) compilation albums
2011 compilation albums
Metal Blade Records albums
Albums produced by Adam Darski